Rhadi Bullard Ferguson (born April 3, 1975) is an American mixed martial arts trainer, strength and conditioning coach, motivational speaker, and black belt in judo and Brazilian jiu-jitsu.

Biography 
Ferguson grew up in Miami, Florida in the United States where he began training in judo at the age of 3 under the tutelage of 7th degree red and white belt Jack Williams, until the age of 4. Ferguson had to quit judo for several years after his family had left Miami and moved to Rockville, Maryland and would not begin training again until after he finished college at age 22.

Ferguson is a seventeen time national champion in judo. At the age of 29, Ferguson competed in judo at the 2004 Summer Olympics in Athens, Greece in the men's half-heavyweight division. He was previously an alternate in the 2000 Summer Olympics in Sydney, Australia.

In addition to judo, Ferguson also holds a black belt in Brazilian jiu-jitsu, and has competed in numerous jiu-jitsu and submission grappling tournaments. Ferguson was a member of American Top Team and received his Black Belt from Ricardo Liborio. During his competitive career, Ferguson who stands  and weighed 260 lb. had a reported 9% body fat.

Ferguson has coached many athletes including; Taraje Williams-Murray,  Lloyd Irvin, Karo Parisyan, Cara Heads, Thiago Alves, Brandon Vera, Jeff Monson, Valerie Gotay, Marco González, and Bobby Lashley.

Education 
Ferguson attended and graduated from Richard Montgomery High School in Rockville, Maryland in 1992. From 1992 to 1997  Ferguson attended Howard University in Washington, DC on a football scholarship and also was one of only a few students in the history of the school to play 3 sports (Football, Wrestling, and Track). Ferguson graduated with a bachelor's degree in mechanical engineering and later in 2002 received his Master of Arts in teaching with a 4.0 GPA from the university. In 2009, he received his Ph.D. in education with a 4.0 GPA from Capella University.
While at Howard University he became a member of the Omega Psi Phi fraternity.

MMA career 
Ferguson made his professional MMA debut in August 2010 and won his first two bouts via TKO in the first round.

Ferguson made his Strikeforce debut at Strikeforce Challengers: Woodley vs. Saffiedine on January 7, 2011, competing in the light heavyweight division.  He was originally scheduled to face Moldovan wrestler Ion Cherdivara, but visa issues forced him off the card with John Richard stepping in as a late replacement. Ferguson defeated Richard by submission (Kneebar) at 2:00 in round 3.

Personal life 
Ferguson currently lives in South Florida and has two children; son Rufus Alexander and daughter Rhadi Isabelle. Ferguson's cousin was a renowned street fighter, The Ultimate Fighter 10 cast member and UFC vet, Kevin "Kimbo Slice" Ferguson.

Mixed martial arts record 

|-
| Win
| align=center| 3–0
| John Richard
| Submission (kneebar)
| Strikeforce Challengers: Woodley vs. Saffiedine
| 
| align=center| 2
| align=center| 2:00
| Nashville, Tennessee, United States
| 
|-
| Win
| align=center| 2–0
| Jeremy Boczulak
| TKO (punches)
| Gameness Fighting Championships
| 
| align=center| 1
| align=center| 1:21
| Nashville, Tennessee, United States
| 
|-
| Win
| align=center| 1–0
| Darryell Perry II
| TKO (punches)
| Hybrid Fight League
| 
| align=center| 1
| align=center| 0:07
| Hopkinsville, Kentucky, United States
|

References

External links 
 

1975 births
African-American mixed martial artists
American male judoka
American male mixed martial artists
American people of Bahamian descent
American practitioners of Brazilian jiu-jitsu
People awarded a black belt in Brazilian jiu-jitsu
American jujutsuka
Light heavyweight mixed martial artists
Living people
Mixed martial artists from Florida
Olympic judoka of the United States
Mixed martial artists utilizing judo
Mixed martial artists utilizing boxing
Mixed martial artists utilizing wrestling
Mixed martial artists utilizing jujutsu
Mixed martial artists utilizing Brazilian jiu-jitsu
Howard University alumni
Capella University alumni
People from Coconut Creek, Florida
Judoka at the 2004 Summer Olympics
21st-century African-American sportspeople
20th-century African-American sportspeople
Sportspeople from Miami